USS Panuco (ID-1533) was a United States Navy cargo ship in commission from 1918 to 1919.

Construction, acquisition, and commissioning
SS Panuco was completed as a commercial cargo ship in January 1917 at Seattle, Washington, by the Seattle Construction and Drydock Company for the New York and Cuba Mail Steamship Company of New York City. The U.S. Navys 3rd Naval District inspected her in 1917 for possible naval service, and the Navy acquired her from her owner under a bareboat charter on 13 September 1918 for use during World War I. She was assigned the naval registry Identification Number (Id. No.) 1533 and commissioned as USS Panuco the same day at New York City.

United States Navy career
Assigned to the Naval Overseas Transportation Service, Panuco was placed on the United States Army account and departed New York City carrying U.S. Army general cargo on 26 September 1918, arriving at Nantes, France, on 16 October 1918. After discharging her cargo at Nantes, she returned to New York City in ballast in November 1918.

On 23 December 1918, Panuco was placed on the United States Shipping Board account, under which she moved to New Orleans, Louisiana, loaded a cargo, and departed on 22 January 1919. She arrived at Montevideo, Uruguay, in February. After discharging her cargo there, she moved to Ramallo, Argentina, where she loaded a cargo of linseed cake and departed for New York City, where she arrived on 19 April 1919.

Panuco was decommissioned on 28 April 1919 and transferred to the U.S. Shipping Board the same day for simultaneous return to the New York and Cuba Mail Steamship Company.

Later career
Once again SS Panuco, the ship resumed commercial service. She was still operating for the New York and Cuba firm when she was destroyed by fire while pierside at New York City on 18 August 1941.

References

Department of the Navy: Naval Historical Center Online Library of Selected Images: Civilian Ships: S.S. Panuco (American Freighter, 1917) Served as USS Panuco (ID # 1533) in 1918-1919.
NavSource Online: Section Patrol Craft Photo Archive: Panuco (ID 1533)

World War I cargo ships of the United States
Ships built in Seattle
1916 ships
Cargo ships of the United States Navy